Deer Island is a small island with only 1-2 residences, located in the Merrimack River in Amesbury, Massachusetts.  The island connects to mainland Amesbury by way of the Derek S. Hines Memorial Bridge, and to neighboring Newburyport via Chain Bridge.

References

External links

Amesbury, Massachusetts
Islands of Essex County, Massachusetts
Merrimack River
River islands of Massachusetts